This is a list of parks in Seoul, South Korea.

See also
List of parks in Daegu
List of rivers of Korea
Geography of South Korea

References

External links 

 Map guide for searching parks in Seoul at the Seoul Metropolitan Government

website
 https://web.archive.org/web/20110928154132/http://parks.seoul.go.kr/
 https://web.archive.org/web/20130414092606/http://hangang.seoul.go.kr/
 https://archive.today/20071020021847/http://www.naukorea.com/n_pA/pA_02.asp?ocode=B000&code=B021

 
Seoul
Seoul
Parks